Alaena interposita is a butterfly in the family Lycaenidae. It is found in Tanzania. The habitat consists of Brachystegia woodland.

Subspecies
Alaena interposita interposita (Tanzania)
Alaena interposita hauttecoeuri Oberthür, 1888 (Tanzania: south-west to the Tabora Region)

References

Butterflies described in 1883
Alaena
Endemic fauna of Tanzania
Butterflies of Africa
Taxa named by Arthur Gardiner Butler